Paolo Giovio (also spelled Paulo Jovio; Latin: Paulus Jovius; 19 April 1483 – 11 December 1552) was an Italian physician, historian, biographer, and prelate.

Early life
Little is known about Giovio's youth. He was a native of Como; his family was from the Isola Comacina of Lake Como. His father, a notary, died around 1500. He was educated under the direction of his elder brother Benedetto, a humanist and historian. Although interested in literature, he was sent to Padua to study medicine. He graduated in 1511.

Career
Giovio worked as physician in Como but, after the plague spread in that city he moved to Rome, settling there in 1513. Pope Leo X assigned him a cathedra (chair) of Moral Philosophy and, later, that of Natural Philosophy in the Roman university. He was also knighted by the Pope. In the same period he started to write historical essays. He wrote a memoir of Leo soon after his death.

In 1517 Giovio was appointed as the personal physician for Cardinal Giulio di Giuliano de' Medici (the future Pope Clement VII). In the field he wrote some treatises, like the De optima victus ratione, in which he expresses his doubts about the current pharmacology, and the need to improve prevention before the cure.

Giovio helped Clement VII during the 1527 sack of Rome. From 1526 to 1528, he stayed on the island of Ischia as Vittoria Colonna's guest. In 1528, he became bishop of Nocera de' Pagani. Giovio wrote an account of Dmitry Gerasimov's embassy to Clement VII, which related detailed geographical data on Muscovy.

In 1536 Giovio had a villa built for him on Lake Como, which he called Museo, and which he used for his collection of portraits of famous soldiers and men of letters. After Clement's death, he retired. As well as paintings, he sought antiquities, etc., and his collection was one of the first to include pieces from the New World. A set of copies of the paintings from the collection, now known as the Giovio Series, is on display in the Uffizi Gallery.

Death
In 1549 Pope Paul III denied Giovio the title of Bishop of Como, and he moved to Florence, where he died in 1552.

Works

Giovio is chiefly known as the author of a celebrated work of contemporary history, Historiarum sui temporis libri XLV, of a collection of lives of famous men, Vitae virorum illustrium (1549‑57), and of Elogia virorum bellica virtute illustrium, (Florence, 1554), which may be translated as Praise of Men Illustrious for Courage in War (1554).

Giovio is best remembered as a chronicler of the Italian Wars. In his work, La prima parte dell'historie del suo tempo, Giovio claimed that Italian soldiers were despised following the Leagues' defeat at Fornovo.  His eyewitness accounts of many of the battles form one of the most significant primary sources for the period. Many pages of his work are devoted to Skanderbeg.

He is the oldest biographer of Raphael.

Giovio's notable work include:
De romanis piscibus (1524)
De legatione Basilii Magni Principis Moschoviae (1525)
Commentario de le cose de’ Turchi (1531)
Elogia virorum litteris illustrium or Elogia doctorum virorum (1546)
Descriptio Britanniae, Scotiae, Hyberniae et Orchadum (1548)
Vitae (1549)
[https://books.google.com/books?id=INJJ14l9qFUC Pauli Jovii historiarum sui temporis] (1550–52)Elogia virorum bellica virtute illustrium (1554), as an eyewitness of many people involved in the Italian Wars including Gonzalo Fernández de CórdobaDialogo dell'imprese militari et amorose'' (1555)

References

Sources

External links

Elogia Doctorum Virorum online (English translation, with life of Paulus Jovius)
Vita de Leonis X (Latin text)

1483 births
1552 deaths
People from the Province of Como
16th-century Italian physicians
Bishops in Campania
16th-century Italian Roman Catholic bishops
16th-century Italian historians
Italian military historians
Italian art collectors